is a lighthouse located on a hill at the outermost extremity of Cape Omae south of Omaezaki Port, Shizuoka Prefecture, Japan.

A lighthouse was built at Cape Omae as early as 1635, when the Tokugawa Shogunate recognized the frequency of marine accidents on the rocks off the coast of Tōtōmi Province.

History 

Omaesaki Lighthouse was one of the 26 lighthouses to be built in Meiji period Japan by British engineer Richard Henry Brunton. Although not one of the eight lighthouses stipulated specifically by the provisions of the Anglo-Japanese Treaty of Amity and Commerce of 1858, construction was given priority by the Meiji government after a Japanese navy vessel grounded on the rocks off Cape Omae on April 8, 1871. Construction began on May 26, 1872 and the lighthouse was completed on May 1, 1874 at a cost of 25,000 yen. The lighthouse is noteworthy as the first to use a  Fresnel lens in Japan.

The light was upgraded to a more powerful beam in 1917. During World War II, Omaesaki Lighthouse was bombarded by United States Navy warships, cracking its lens and causing severe damage to its structure. The light was repaired after the end of the war, and its lens upgraded to a third order Fresnel. It went back into operation on March 24, 1949.

Omaesaki Lighthouse is currently open to the public, and can be ascended for a panoramic view of the Pacific Ocean. It is registered with the Japanese government as an “A-grade Lighthouse” for historic preservation and is listed as one of the “50 Lighthouses of Japan” by the Japan Lighthouse Association. It is operated by the Japan Coast Guard.

Name 
But the lighthouse name is "".

See also 

 List of lighthouses in Japan

Notes

References 
Brunton, Richard. Building Japan, 1868–1879. Japan Library, 1991. 
Pedlar, Neil. The Imported Pioneers: Westerners who Helped Build Modern Japan. Routledge, 1990.

External links 
 Historic Lighthouses of Japan
 Lighthouses in Japan  
 Omaezaki City official home page

Lighthouses completed in 1874
Buildings and structures in Shizuoka Prefecture
Lighthouses in Japan
Tourist attractions in Shizuoka Prefecture
Museums in Shizuoka Prefecture
Lighthouse museums in Japan
Buildings of the Meiji period
Omaezaki, Shizuoka
1874 establishments in Japan